Vitaliy Pavlov may refer to:

 Vitaliy Pavlov (footballer, born 1965), Soviet and Ukrainian football manager and player
 Vitaliy Pavlov (footballer, born 1988), Ukrainian football midfielder